Burak Bekdil (born 1966 in Ankara, Turkey) is a Turkish columnist who wrote for the daily Hürriyet for 29 years. He was fired in January 2017. Today he is a Fellow at the Middle East Forum and has covered Turkey for the U.S. weekly Defense News since 1997. His articles have been published in many international media outlets including The Wall Street Journal, The Economist, BBC, The Guardian, Reuters, Associated Press, Bloomberg, Los Angeles Times, The New York Times, Haaretz, The Jerusalem Post, Toronto Star, Financial Times, Le Figaro, ABC, El Pais, Stern, Al-Arabiya, etc.

James Cuno, art historian and President of the J. Paul Getty Trust, describes Bekdil as "a frequent critic of Prime Minister Recep Tayyip Erdoğan.
in 2002, he received an eighteen-month suspended sentence for "insulting the judiciary".

Footnotes

Turkish journalists
Turkish columnists
People from Ankara
Hürriyet people
Living people
Place of birth missing (living people)
1966 births